Morus macroura, also known as the king white mulberry, shahtoot mulberry, Tibetan mulberry, or long mulberry is a flowering plant species in the genus Morus found in Tibet, the Himalayas, mountainous area of Indonesia, and rain forests of  Indochina. It is a medium-sized tree, with a spreading canopy which grows with a weeping habit. Ripe fruit is white, pink or red, and is described as honey-sweet.

References

macroura
Plants described in 1851
Trees of China
Trees of the Indian subcontinent
Trees of Indo-China
Taxa named by Friedrich Anton Wilhelm Miquel